The Wedding in Monaco is a 1956 documentary film covering the celebrations in Monaco leading up to the wedding of Prince Rainier III to Grace Kelly. The 31-minute Eastmancolor CinemaScope film was directed by Jean Masson and released by Metro-Goldwyn-Mayer, Kelly's film studio before her retirement from acting.

Reception
According to MGM records the film earned $108,000 in the US and Canada and $51,000 elsewhere resulting in a profit of $15,000.

See also
 List of American films of 1956
 Monte Carlo: C'est La Rose

References

External links
 
 
 

1956 films
1956 documentary films
Films shot in Monaco
Documentary films about royalty
Documentary films about women
Metro-Goldwyn-Mayer short films